Ormsby is a surname. The name originates from people of the Southern areas of Scandinavia who would later migrate to Wales & England. In Old Norse the surname is translated to mean either "Home Of Serpents" or "Land Of Dragons", in Old English the name translates to "By The Orm" or in Welsh "By The Elm".

The origins of the name date back to the tales of the Viking, Orm, around the year 1050. Orm became famous during a particular raid on Scotland. Before the raiding party had left the Jarl had declared that the first man to set foot on Scottish soil would have first claim to the land. As the Vikings neared the Scottish coast, they were intercepted by the natives & a sea battle ensued. During the battle, Orm's leg was severed from his body. This did not stop him from fighting though, & as the days battle came to an end, the Vikings were victorious & made their way towards the coast. As his ship drew near the beach, Orm picked up his severed leg & hurled it at the beach. This signified he was the first man to set foot on Scotland & therefore earned the claim of the land. This is why when you look at the Ormsby coat of arms or family crest you will notice a severed leg in the artwork.

Notable people with the surname include:
Alan Ormsby (born 1944), American director and screenwriter
Brendan Ormsby (born 1960), English professional footballer
Eric Ormsby (born 1941), American poet and a man of letters
Frank Ormsby (born 1947), Northern Irish poet
Hilda Ormsby, (1877-1973), British geographer
John Ormsby (disambiguation), multiple people
Kristian Ormsby (born 1980), New Zealand rugby union player
Len Ormsby (1890–1983), American racecar driver 
Mary Ormsby (born 1960), Canadian associate sports writer
George Ormsby-Gore, 3rd Baron Harlech (1855–1938), Conservative British MP
Oliver Ormsby (1767–1832) American businessman in Pittsburgh, Pennsylvania
Stephen Ormsby (1759–1844), U.S. Representative from Kentucky 
Waterman Ormsby (1809–1883), a 19th-century banknote engraver, inventor and artist
Waterman L. Ormsby (1834–1908), correspondent for the New York Herald and Western explorer

References

External links
www.surnameguide.com